Kaneye  is a village and commune of the Cercle of Goudam in the Tombouctou Region of Mali. As of 1998 the commune had a population of 2,418.

References

Communes of Tombouctou Region